The Gospel Truth is an album by pianist Les McCann recorded in 1963 and released on the Pacific Jazz label.

Reception

Allmusic gives the album 3 stars.

Track listing 
All compositions by Les McCann except as indicated
 "The Gospel Truth" - 1:55
 "Isn't It Wonderful" - 4:10
 "Oh the Joy" - 3:10
 "Let Us Break Bread Together" (Traditional) - 5:08
 "Didn't It Rain" (Traditional) - 4:05
 "Send It Down to Me" - 4:08
 "Get That Soul" - 2:34
 "The Preacher" (Horace Silver) - 4:30
 "Were You There" (Traditional) - 4:53
 "Bye and Bye" (Traditional) - 2:03

Personnel 
Les McCann - piano
Charles Kynard - organ (tracks 1, 6 & 9) 
Stanley Gilbert - bass
Paul Humphrey - drums

References 

Les McCann albums
1963 albums
Pacific Jazz Records albums